Salem Township is one of twelve townships in Allen County, Kansas, United States. As of the 2010 census, its population was 249.

Geography
According to the USGS, it contains two cemeteries: Maple Grove and Salem.

Transportation
Salem Township contains one airport or landing strip, Croisant Airport.

References
 USGS Geographic Names Information System (GNIS)

External links
 US-Counties.com
 City-Data.com

Townships in Allen County, Kansas
Townships in Kansas